Christian Churches Together in the USA (CCT) is an organization formed in 2006 to "broaden and expand fellowship, unity and witness among the diverse expressions of Christian traditions in the USA."

Christian Churches Together was created as a space for dialogue and cooperation among churches and ecumenical Christian organizations. It does not attempt to combine Christian faiths or compromise their distinctiveness. Rather, It provides a context in which churches can develop relationships with other churches with whom they presently have little or no contact. Christian Churches Together includes most, if not all, the Christian traditions in the USA {Catholic, Orthodox, Historic Protestant, Evangelical/Pentecostal, and Historic Black churches}. It also includes non-denominational Christian organizations. The major activity of the organization is the Annual Forum. In the past few years, topics addressed at the annual forum included gospel perspectives of life, immigration, mass incarceration, poverty and racism. CCT only speaks out on issues in which all the churches agree, coming to a decision by way of the consensus model.

Mission statement
CCT brings together the diversity of Christian churches and organizations in the U.S. to foster loving relationships, cultivate theological learning, and discern through consensus how we bear witness to the reconciling power of Jesus.

Vision statement
Christian Churches Together enables churches and national Christian organizations to grow closer together in Christ in order to strengthen our Christian witness in the world.

The CCT process
Based on these vision and mission statements, a process for organizing the ministry of CCT is essential.  This process was designed with the hope it will be applicable both to the national CCT and to local expressions that may come into existence.  This process will be a “work in progress,” and it will assume several things:

1. We are always calling ourselves to humility before Christ and each other.  This reminder, in the form of both worship and proclamation, must be built into the beginning of every gathering, and woven throughout our time together.

2. We are continually looking for new groups of Christians to include in the ministry, with a special emphasis of including more young adults.  We will set the goal of having 20% of attendance at forums being persons under age 35 by the time of the 2026 Forum.  This will require intentional conversations with the leadership of all faith communions and Christian organizations.

3. This spirit of inclusion also extends to other ecumenical groups, organizations and regional councils within the United States.  Therefore, CCT will keep in mind how we can reach out to those groups and partner with them in whatever we do.  Conversations will be held and specific invitations issued. The hope is the CCT process will be replicated across the country in regional and/or state ecumenical councils and associations.

4. CCT will make decisions by consensus.  Emphasis will be placed on building relationships and understanding, and we know disagreements will happen.  Only when there is consensus will joint action be taken.  Members are encouraged, however, to take action within their own faith communions and within created coalitions.

5. It is important CCT work on the “religious literacy” of Christians in the US, and therefore the concept of receptive ecumenism, through which we learn from each other about theologies, histories and organizations, will always be held as foundational.  To that end there will be an annual inclusion of “experts” on the designated topic at hand.  This means inviting well-known persons from within our Family Groups, who are on the right, center and left of the topic or issue.  They will be invited to help with Bible study, theology and dialogue.  This is important, because knowledge of specific issues is not necessarily the forte of persons who ecumenically represent faith communions and Christian organizations.  The tools these experts would bring will be essential to the conversations.

6. It is possible bylaw changes may be necessary as we implement this new process.  When that is the case, the Bylaws Committee will work on these changes and bring them for discussion to a Forum, so consensus around them can be built.  In the interim, we will begin to live into the changes described and allow for some flexibility.

Leadership
The current executive director of Christian Churches Together is Dr. Monica Schaap Pierce, who is a member of the Reformed Church in America. Her predecessors were Rev. Carlos Malave and Rev. Richard (Dick) Hamm.

History

In 2001, a number of US churches leaders began discussing the possibility of forming a new organization that would provide a broader-based space than that provided by the National Council of Churches or the National Association of Evangelicals. On September 7–8, 2001, various American church leaders met informally in Baltimore to explore whether or not the time had come to “create a new, more inclusive body.” At the meeting no votes were taken, but there was a strong desire among the participants for a broader structure of some kind that would include all the major groupings of churches.

This conversation continued in Chicago (April 4 – 6, 2002), Pasadena (January 27 – 29, 2003), Houston (January 7 – 9, 2004), and Los Altos (June 1 – 3, 2005) with an ever expanding and more diverse group of Christian leaders. As a result of these efforts, 34 churches and organizations formed Christian Churches Together in the US in Atlanta on March 30, 2006. In 2017, the Bruderhof Communities, the Redeemed Christian Church of God and the International Justice Mission joined CCT.

Participants in CCT includes churches and associations of churches that are national in scope, as well as national Christian organizations and worldwide churches such as the Salvation Army which has a territory (national division) in the United States. Participant churches and organizations must accept and endorse the theological basis and purposes of CCT. They agree to attend meetings on a regular basis and to pay the dues established.

Member churches and organizations
, the members are:
Antiochian Orthodox Christian Archdiocese
Archdiocese of the Syriac Orthodox Church of Antioch
Armenian Orthodox Church in America  
Bread for the World
Christian Church (Disciples of Christ)
Christian Reformed Church in North America
Church of God (Anderson, Indiana)
Church of the Brethren
Cooperative Baptist Fellowship
Evangelical Lutheran Church in America
Christians for Social Action
Greek Orthodox Archdiocese of America
Habitat for Humanity International
Hope for You
International Council of Community Churches
International Justice Mission
International Pentecostal Holiness Church
Mennonite Church USA
Moravian Church
National Baptist Convention of America
National Baptist Convention, USA
National Hispanic Christian Leadership Conference
Orthodox Church in America
Reformed Church in America
Sojourners
The Bruderhof
The Episcopal Church USA
Korean Presbyterian Church in America
Presbyterian Church USA
The Salvation Army
The United Methodist Church
The Vineyard USA
United Church of Christ
US Conference of Catholic Bishops
Zomi Baptist Churches

See also
Churches Uniting in Christ
Global Christian Forum

References

List of participants https://www.christianchurchestogether.org/participant-communions

External links
Christian Churches Together internet home

Christian denominations established in the 21st century
Christian ecumenical organizations
Christian organizations based in the United States
Christian organizations established in 2006
Church of God (Anderson, Indiana)
Free Methodist Church
The Salvation Army
United Methodist Church
2006 establishments in Georgia (U.S. state)